Arif Khan may refer to:
 Arif Khan (cricketer)
 Arif Khan (skier)
 Arif Khan (warlord)
 Arif Mohammad Khan
 Arif Khan Joy

Arif Khan Was An Indian Actor